Wear Kibler Schoonover (March 18, 1910 – May 12, 1982) was an American college football player.  He was elected to the College Football Hall of Fame in 1967.

Playing career
He was the first Arkansas Razorback, as well as the first Southwestern football player, to be on the All-American team.

Schoonover is one of five members of the inaugural class of the Arkansas Sports Hall of Fame.

He was one of 11 All-American football players to appear in the 1930 film "Maybe It's Love".

References

External links
 
 

1910 births
1982 deaths
People from Pocahontas, Arkansas
Arkansas Razorbacks football players
College Football Hall of Fame inductees
Arkansas Razorbacks baseball players
Arkansas Razorbacks men's basketball players
Arkansas Razorbacks men's track and field athletes
All-American college men's basketball players
All-Southern college football players
Players of American football from Arkansas
American football ends
American men's basketball players